Zanandore is a town in Karuzi, Burundi, Africa with a population of 27,867

References

Populated places in Burundi